Hakka himeshimensis is a species of the spider family Salticidae (jumping spiders). It is the only species in the genus Hakka. H. himeshimensis is native to East Asia, but it has been introduced to the United States. The species is most commonly found in rocky coastal habitats.

Description

Both sexes have a body length of about 7 mm. The body and legs are uniformly dark brown. The body is covered with sparse lighter hairs. Between the eyes there are longer, reddish hairs that stand up diagonally. The chelicerae are brown and robust.

Distribution
Hakka himeshimensis occurs in China, North Korea, Japan, Hawaii, and the Eastern United States. It is not clear if there is a viable population in Hawaii, or if the found specimens represent incidental recent arrivals (although three specimens were collected over a period of 74 years). It is likely that the species was accidentally introduced to the Eastern United States by maritime shipping.

Name
The genus name is derived from Hakka, a Chinese people with 70 million worldwide. Many members were brought to Hawaii as laborers on sugar cane plantations in the middle of the 19th century. This is probably a reference to the species' origin in Asia.

Footnotes

References
Berry, James W. and Jerzy Prószyński (2001). "Description of Hakka, a new genus of jumping spiders (Araneae, Salticidae) from Hawaii and east Asia". Journal of Arachnology 29(2): 201-204. Abstract - PDF
Kaldari, Ryan, G. B. Edwards, and Richard K. Walton (2011). "First records of Hakka (Araneae: Salticidae) in North America". Peckhamia (94.1): 1–6.

Further reading
Bösenberg, W. &  Strand, E. (1906): Japanische Spinnen. Abhandlungen der Senckenbergischen Naturforschenden Gesellschaft 30:93-422.

External links

Diagnostic drawings of H. himeshimensis

Salticidae
Spiders of Asia
Spiders described in 1906